WaterAid is an international non-governmental organization, focused on water, sanitation and hygiene. It was set up in 1981 as a response to the UN International Drinking Water decade (1981–1990). As of 2018, it was operating in 34 countries.

The  organisation was first established by the UK water industry on 21 July 1981 as a charitable trust at their main office premises in London, and established first projects in Zambia and Sri Lanka. In 2010, it became a federation, comprising, members in the United Kingdom, USA, Australia, Japan, Sweden, Canada and India, and regional offices and country programmes in 27 countries in Latin America, Africa and Asia. Activities involve providing people with clean water, safe sanitation, hygiene behaviour change and advocacy with governments and water utilities. Its income has moved from £1 million per annum in 1987 to £113 million in 2018–19.

History

WaterAid was founded in 1981 by members of the UK water industry at the Thirsty Third World conference held in London. WaterAid was formally established as a charity in the UK on 21 July 1981. Its president is Prince Charles, the King of United Kingdom, since 1991. Other members were established as follows: WaterAid America and Australia in 2004, Sweden in 2009. In 2010, the organisation became a federation, and established the WaterAid International secretariat. In 2014, WaterCan/EauVive, an NGO founded in Canada in 1987, became WaterAid Canada and joined the federation.

In 1993 WaterAid began work on their 1000th project, and also agreed to fund the Hitosa Gravity Scheme in Ethiopia. The Hitosa scheme was the largest single water supply scheme implemented in Ethiopia at the time, reaching 50,000 people.

In 2003, WaterAid was named UK charity of the year at the Charity Times Awards. Also, in November 2006 WaterAid said that it was "Britain's most Admired Charity 2006", as voted by its peers in the voluntary sector (in Third Sector magazine). WaterAid came top of the category followed by Save the Children and The Samaritans. Andrew Cook, then WaterAid's Director of Communications and Fundraising said "We are delighted to have won this prestigious accolade. This award is testament to the tireless work of all WaterAid's staff and volunteers both in the UK and internationally". WaterAid was also a Stockholm Water Prize laureate in 1995.

In 2009, a new Global Strategy was launched, with the target of reaching 25 million more people across 30 countries by 2015. By 2011, WaterAid's 30th anniversary year, they had reached almost 16 million people with safe water and over 11 million with sanitation. In 2015, WaterAid launched 2015-2020 Global Strategy and its mission is to transform lives of the poorest people by improving access to sanitation, hygiene and safe water.

In February 2022, WaterAid WaterAid launched its first legacy campaign, "What Jack gave," concentrating on will donations. Legacy income currently accounts for approximately 10% of WaterAid's total income.

Fundraising 

WaterAid has been associated with the Glastonbury Festival since 1994. In 2006 the festival's founder Michael Eavis and his daughter Emily visited WaterAid's work in Mozambique and by 2007 130 WaterAid volunteers helped at the festival. In 2011, there were around 200 WaterAid volunteers present.. In 2016, by which time there were over 500 WaterAid volunteers at Glastonbury, the charity introduced Talking Toilets which gave out information voiced by celebrities such as Cerys Matthews and Brian Blessed.

Among WaterAid's many fundraising events is 'Coast Along for WaterAid', a sponsored walk along sections of the South West Coast Path, which took place annually between 2005 and 2012. In 2010 the then UK Prime Minister, Gordon Brown took part.

In 2012, WaterAid partnered with Waterlogic to help raise funds for the poorest communities in the world, to provide them with clean and sanitary water. Waterlogic's Firewall technology purifies water and destroys harmful bacteria. Waterlogic pledged US$225,000 to WaterAid over 3 years.

Fundraising events and initiatives in 2013 included The WaterAid200 Mountain Challenge as well as various running, cycling and other sporting challenges as well as Street fundraising.

Its twice-yearly magazine is called 'Oasis' and includes news and features on planned and completed projects. WaterAid is a founding member of the End Water Poverty campaign calling for water and sanitation for all.

WaterAid America's office runs several fundraising campaigns, notably the COVID-19 Response and No Water on the Frontlines, an appeal for essential workers around the world.

The organization also receives direct funding from a variety of corporations, non-profit organizations, and academic institutions. Notable donors include the Bill & Melinda Gates Foundation, Boeing, Conrad N. Hilton Foundation, Google, Mercy Corps, New Venture Fund, PepsiCo, Pfizer, USAID, and the World Bank Group.

Activities

WaterAid works in partnership with local organisations in 34 countries in Africa, Asia, Central America and the Pacific region to help poor communities establish sustainable water supplies and toilets, close to home, and to promote safe hygiene practices. It also works to influence government water and sanitation policies to serve the interests of vulnerable people and to ensure water and sanitation are prioritised in poverty reduction plans. As a matter of policy, WaterAid supports public ownership and control of water supplies, but does not take a particular view regarding public, community or private participation in service provision.

COVID-19 response

WaterAid provided support in the following countries: Bangladesh, Cambodia, Colombia, Eswatini, Ethiopia, Ghana, India, Madagascar, Malawi, Myanmar, Mali, Nepal, Nigeria, Pakistan, South Africa, Timor-Leste, Uganda and Zambia.

Zambia
WaterAid first started work in Zambia during the 1992-1994 drought. Since then, the organization has expanded its operations to seven districts in the country, five of which are in the Southern Province (Monze, Siavonga, Namwala, Itezhitezhi and Kazungula) while the other two are Kafue in Lusaka Province and Kaoma in Western Province. The organization spends about ZMK8-9 billion (just over £1 million) annually on projects there, and have since provided 42,600 people in Zambia with access to clean, safe water.

Efforts in Monze District

WaterAid is working with the government to help extend access to safe water, sanitation and improved hygiene for rural communities in Monze District. Sichiyanda is one such village in the Monze district where efforts are in progress. Projects in the village began in 2001 and the community worked together to dig a well with dedicated bucket and windlass. Hygiene education is also taking place, where villagers are taught to keep areas clean by building dish racks and rubbish pits and ensuring that there are no stagnant pools of water where mosquitoes can breed. In addition, 28 latrines have already been constructed with more underway.

Such programmes have led to significant improvements in the lives of villages in rural Monze. The building of wells have led to time savings for women and children. For women, much of this newly available time has been put to productive economic activities like basket weaving and pottery making for use and sale. For children, it has led to increased attendance in schools. In light of this, WaterAid has since put up a tender request for an additional 32 boreholes (necessary for the construction of wells) to be drilled in Monze.

Milenge Self Supply Project

While most of WaterAid's projects have been subsidized, the Milenge Project stands out for being one that is self-supplied. It has been possible to stimulate real demand in the district, and this means rural water supply upgrading can take place with no subsidy for materials. WaterAid is now working in four wards of Western Milenge on Self Supply, and 16 masons (4 per ward) have already been trained, having attended two separate one-month courses at Mansa Trades Training Institute. Besides being trained technically, these masons are also trained to work together and on how to promote their services. They speak to households independently, and some 95 well owners have since expressed interest in their services.  Moreover, considering the fact that these areas are some of the poorest in Zambia and that the rural population is on average poorer than those in other piloting countries, such a response is truly impressive.

America
WaterAid becomes a global federation, opening offices in North America and Australia. WaterAid America's office is in New York and manages programs in Latin America.

India
WaterAid works closely with its partners in local communities to utilise low cost technologies to deliver sustainable water supply, sanitation and hygiene solutions to the poor in the economically less developed countries. WaterAid's vision is of a world where everyone has access to safe water and sanitation.

Since its presence in India from 1986, WaterAid India has been growing in its significance in providing assistance to the poor in both rural and urban areas. Today, WaterAid covers over ten states (Andhra Pradesh, Bihar, Chhattisgarh, Delhi, Jharkhand, Karnataka, Madhya Pradesh, Orissa, Tamil Nadu and Uttar Pradesh), rendering their services to the communities that needed help most.

Role in India

The main thrust of WaterAid India's projects is to advocate the use of latrines and to provide hygiene education with training manuals to the poorer and less educated areas. It aims to bring across the detrimental effects of poor hygiene; such as diseases, loss of efficiency and high expenses in the form of costly medicine. WaterAid India hopes to inspire local communities to develop their own cost effective solutions to the existing problems.

In addition, WaterAid India, with other partner organisations, came together to tackle the issue of having access to potable water in the coastal states of India. The roots of this crisis are linked to development. Sustainable development has proved challenging for many of India's coastal states, as they struggle to balance their delicate ecology against heavy economic demands and the desire for growth. WaterAid India and its partners explored the feasibility of technological alternatives to the problem of salinity in the groundwater - for example, rainwater harvesting, desalination and dew harvesting - and looked towards establishing an area-specific strategy for ensuring access to a domestic water supply in coastal regions.

Achievements and Prospects

WaterAid has achieved many other significant milestones since its inception. The WaterAid project in Kalmandhai, Tiruchirapalli was declared the country's first 100% sanitised slum in 2002. Khajapattai was recently announced as the seventh. In 2009/10, nearly 240,000 people managed to have access to safe water and sanitation, through WaterAid supported projects.

WaterAid India also plays a vital role in advising Indian policy makers to include low-cost latrines into existing sanitation subsidies in 1999, after two years of advocacy. This exemplifies WaterAid India's persuasive powers and intent of alleviating poverty in India. Since 2003, WaterAid India has shifted its focus to the poorer states in northern India where local communities there require great assistance. In order to better meet the need of these communities, WaterAid India has shifted its head office to New Delhi.

Bangladesh
WaterAid started its work in Bangladesh in 1986. It has successfully collaborated with 21 organizations in Bangladesh up to now to alleviate the sufferings from scarce water supply and low sanitation standards in poverty-plagued villages.

With WaterAid Bangladesh rendering their help in the technical field, The Village Education Resource Centre (VERC) introduced the community-led total sanitation (CLTS) model. It aims to educate villagers on the harmful effects that open defecation brings to the environment and to their health. In addition, the CLTS programme help to build toilets for the local communities so as to facilitate them in shifting to a more hygienic lifestyle. UNICEF recognized that the programme had been so impactful in Bangladesh that many organizations and countries had replicated it.

In 2011, the additional number of people who could access to water and sanitation thanks to WaterAid's programme is 259,000 and 536,000 respectively.  WaterAid is currently working with Bangladesh government to build the National Sanitation Strategy, which would help them to reach universal access to sanitation by 2015. Recognizing WaterAid's efforts and the change that they made in running the National Sanitation Campaign together with other NGOs, Bangladesh government presented the National Sanitation Award to WaterAid as a gesture of appreciation.

Latrine design and construction 

WaterAid encouraged local villagers to design and construct better latrine for themselves.   This empowered people to be more involved and learn more about sanitation in the process. Furthermore, local participants could personalize it to fit their preferences and needs.

WaterAid also introduced a programme called "Naming and Shaming", in which anyone caught defecating in the open would have their names taken down and made known to the whole community.  Explaining why this works, Institute of Development Studies (University of Sussex) stated that it triggered people's pride and feelings so strongly that they were highly motivated to change, i.e. building their own toilets and stop open defecation.

The Water Supply and Sanitation Collaborative Council (Switzerland) stated that 49 out of 80 unions had attained 100% sanitation coverage.

Hygiene education

WaterAid brought across the message of sanitation and hygienic defecation to the young by collaborating with a local music-theatre performance troupe who performed various educational for children. 
 
However, WaterAid does face some difficulties: almost unable to seek support and donations from companies in Bangladesh to ensure a high hygienic level. Mr. Mohammed Sabur, the Director of WaterAid Bangladesh said that since labour was abundant, companies were not afraid of labour shortage should their employees fall sick. The only companies likely to support the programme were those with benefits in mind such as Unilever, who wanted to sell more soap.

Canada

WaterCan/EauVive was established as a registered Canadian charity in 1987 by Michael Lubbock to "helping the world's poorest people gain access to clean drinking water, basic sanitation and hygiene education". It works in 37 countries — like Bangladesh, Kenya, Nicaragua, and Uganda — by partnering with local organizations to assist the poorest and most marginalized communities. WaterAid Canada implemented sanitation projects benefiting 2.2 million people and safe water projects benefiting 1.7 million people by 2014. The charity also organized 4,000 education sessions focused on menstrual hygiene in Bangladesh. It receives funding through donations by individuals, organizations, and foundations and the Canadian International Development Agency. In 2013, it became a member of the global federation WaterAid, and was named WaterAid Canada in mid-2014.

References

External links
 WaterAid's website

 WaterAid's list on GuideStar

Development charities based in the United Kingdom
Glastonbury Festival
International organisations based in London
Water and the environment
Charities based in London
International charities
Water-related charities